"Have a Little Faith" is a song written by Billy Sherrill and Glenn Sutton, and recorded by American country music artist David Houston.  It was released in February 1968 as the first single from the album Already It's Heaven.  The song was Houston's fourth number one single on the country charts.  The single stayed at number one for a single week and spent a total of thirteen weeks on the chart. "Have a Little Faith was a crossover hit peaking at #18 on Billboard's Easy Listening survey.

Chart performance

References

1968 singles
David Houston (singer) songs
Songs written by Billy Sherrill
Songs written by Glenn Sutton
Song recordings produced by Billy Sherrill
Epic Records singles
1968 songs